Christianity is  the religion of a major part of the population in Sohag Governorate in Egypt. The Minya Governorate, Asyut Governorate and Qena Governorate has also a sizable Christian populations. 
Important Christian landmarks in the Sohag Goverorate includeWhite Monastery (Deir el-Abyad) and the Red Monastery (Deir el-Ahmar) of the Copts. Sohag is the seat of a bishop of the Coptic Orthodox Church of Alexandria. A diocese of Sohag under the Patriarch of Alexandria of the Copts exists. In 2000, 21 Christians were killed in an attack by Muslims of Arab tribes. Security forces (SSI)
arrested over one thousand two hundred Coptic Christians in Sohag 
on the 15th of August 1998. 
There were riots between Copts and Muslims of Arab tribes in 1999. 
Monk and prophet Shenute (about 350–465; Abbot of the White Monastery) was a key figure in the struggle against idolatry. The governorate was the site of violent clashes of Islamists versus the government. 

The late Patriarch Stéphanos II Ghattas of the Coptic Catholic Church, a cardinal, was born in Sohag Governorate.

See also
Christianity in Minya Governorate

References

Sohag Governorate
Christianity in Egypt